Second Battle of Monte Cassino order of battle February 1944 is a listing of the significant formations that were involved in the fighting on the Winter Line in February 1944 during the period generally known as the Second Battle of Monte Cassino.

Allied Armies in Italy
C-in-C: General Sir Harold Alexander
Chief of Staff: Lieutenant-General Sir John Harding

British 8th Army
Commander:
Lieutenant-General Oliver Leese

New Zealand Corps
Lieutenant-General Bernard Freyberg
2nd New Zealand Division (Major-General Howard Kippenberger)
5th Infantry Brigade
21st Infantry Battalion
23rd Infantry Battalion
28th (Māori) Infantry Battalion
6th Infantry Brigade
24th Infantry Battalion
25th Infantry Battalion
26th Infantry Battalion
4th Armoured Brigade
18th Armoured Regiment
19th Armoured Regiment
20th Armoured Regiment
22nd Motorised Battalion
Divisional troops
4th, 5th and 6th Field Regiments, New Zealand Artillery
14th Light Anti-aircraft Regiment, NZA
11th and 17th Field Regiments, Royal Artillery
66th and 80th Medium Regiments, RA
6th, 7th and 8th Field Company, New Zealand Engineers
5th Field Park Company, NZE
2nd NZ Division Reconnaissance Regiment
4th Indian Infantry Division (Major-General Francis Tuker until 4 February then Brigadier Harry Dimoline (due to illness))
5th Indian Infantry Brigade (Brigadier D. R. E. R. Bateman)
1/4th Battalion, Essex Regiment
4th Battalion, 6th Rajputana Rifles
1st Battalion, 6th Gurkha Rifles
7th Indian Infantry Brigade (Brigadier O. de T. Lovett)
1st Battalion, Royal Sussex Regiment
4th Battalion, 16th Punjab Regiment
1st Battalion, 2nd Gurkha Rifles
11th Indian Infantry Brigade (Brigadier V. C. Griffin)
2nd Battalion, Queen's Own Cameron Highlanders
1st Battalion, 6th Rajputana Rifles
2nd Battalion, 7th Gurkha Rifles
Divisional troops
1st, 11th and 31st Field Regiments, Royal Artillery
149th Anti-tank Regiment, RA
27th Anti-aircraft Regiment, RA
Engineers
4th Field Company, King George's Own Bengal Sappers and Miners
12th Field Company, Queen Victoria's Own Madras Sappers and Miners
21st Field Company, Royal Bombay Sappers and Miners
11th Field Park Company, Queen Victoria's Own Madras Sappers and Miners
5th Indian Bridging Platoon
Central India Horse (Reconnaissance Regiment)
Machine gun Battalion, 6th Rajputana Rifles
British 78th Infantry Division (from 17 February) (Major-General Charles Keightley)
11th British Infantry Brigade
2nd Battalion, Lancashire Fusiliers
1st Battalion, East Surrey Regiment
5th (Huntingdonshire) Battalion, Northamptonshire Regiment
36th British Infantry Brigade
5th Battalion, Buffs (Royal East Kent Regiment)
6th Battalion, Queen's Own Royal West Kent Regiment
8th Battalion, Argyll and Sutherland Highlanders
38th (Irish) Infantry Brigade
2nd Battalion, London Irish Rifles
1st Battalion, Royal Irish Fusiliers
6th Battalion, Royal Inniskilling Fusiliers
Divisional troops
17th, 132nd and 128th Field Regiments, RA
64th Anti-tank Regiment, RA
49th Light Anti-aircraft Regiment, RA
214th, 237th and 256th Field Company, Royal Engineers
281st Field Park Company, RE
21st Bridging Platoon, RE
56th Reconnaissance Regiment
1st Battalion, Kensington Regiment (MG)
Corps troops
2nd Army Group, RA (under command)
166th (Newfoundland) Field Artillery Regiment
Two additional Field Regiments, RA
Five Medium Regiments, RA

German Army Group C
Commander:
Field Marshal Albert Kesselring

Tenth Army
Commander: General Heinrich von Vietinghoff

XIV Panzer Corps
Lieutenant-General Frido von Senger und Etterlin
 15th Panzergrenadier Division (elements at Anzio ordered back to Tenth Army on 8 February) (Major General (Generalleutnant) Rudolf Sperl)
104th Panzer Grenadier Regiment
3 battalions
115th Panzer Grenadier Regiment
3 battalions
129th Panzer Grenadier Regiment
3 battalions
Divisional troops
115th Armoured Reconnaissance battalion
115th Panzer battalion
33rd Artillery battalion
33rd Anti-tank battalion
115th Engineer battalion
29th Panzergrenadier Division (ordered to Anzio early Feb) Lieutenant General (General der Panzertruppen) Walter Fries)
15th Panzer Grenadier Regiment
3 battalions
71st Panzer Grenadier Regiment
3 battalions
Divisional troops
129th Armoured Reconnaissance battalion
129th Panzer battalion
29th Artillery Regiment
29th Anti-tank battalion
29th Engineer battalion
171st Engineer battalion
 44th Infantry Division (Major General (Generalleutnant) Friedrich Franek)
131st Infantry Regiment
3 battalions
132nd Infantry Regiment
3 battalions
134th Infantry Regiment
3 battalions
Divisional troops
44th Fusilier battalion
96th Artillery Regiment
46th Anti-tank battalion
96th Engineer battalion
 71st Infantry Division (elements at Anzio ordered back to Tenth Army on 8 February) (Major General (Generalleutnant) Wilhelm Raapke)
191st Infantry Regiment
3 battalions
194th Infantry Regiment
3 battalions
211st Infantry Regiment
3 battalions
Divisional troops
171st Fusilier battalion
171st Artillery Regiment
171st Anti-tank battalion
90th Panzergrenadier Division (Major-General Ernst-Gunther Baade. Placed in charge of all troops in the Cassino position from 1 February.)
155th Panzer Grenadier Regiment
3 battalions
200th Panzer Grenadier Regiment (Colonel von Behr)
3 battalions
361st Panzer Grenadier Regiment
3 battalions
Divisional troops
190th Armoured Reconnaissance battalion
190th Panzer battalion
190th Artillery Regiment
90th Anti-tank battalion
90th Engineer battalion
3rd battalion 3rd Parachute Regiment
2nd battalion 1st Parachute Regiment
Parachute Machine Gun Battalion
4th Alpine Battalion
 94th Infantry Division (Major General (Generalleutnant) Bernhard Steinmetz)
267th Infantry Regiment
3 battalions
274th Infantry Regiment
3 battalions
276th Infantry Regiment
3 battalions
Divisional troops
94th Fusilier battalion
194th Artillery Regiment
194th Anti-tank battalion
94th Engineer battalion

Notes
Footnotes

Citations

Sources
 
 
 
 
 
 

Monte Cassino
Italian campaign (World War II)
Battle of Monte Cassino